Nelly (born 1974) is an American rapper, singer, actor and entrepreneur.

Nelly or Nellie may also refer to:

Places 
 Nellie, Ohio, an American village
 Nellie, Assam, a town in Nagaon district
 Nelly Island, Antarctica
 Nelly Island, Bermuda
 Mount Nelly, Bolivia, a stratovolcano in the Andes

People 
 Nelly (given name), a list of people with the given name or nickname Nelly or Nellie
 Nelly (Egyptian entertainer), Egyptian singer, actor, and radio and television personality and presenter
 Nelly Furtado, a Canadian singer, songwriter and record producer
 Nelly Attar, a Lebanese athlete, first Arab woman to summit K2 
 Nelly's (1899–1998), Greek photographer (real name Elli Souyioultzoglou-Seraïdari)
 Harry Nelly, head coach of the Army college football program from 1908 to 1910

Arts and entertainment 
 Nelly (2004 film), a French film
 Nelly (2016 film), a Canadian film
 Nellie, a boat in Joseph Conrad's novella Heart of Darkness

Other uses
 , a Danish steamship in service between 1928 and 1936
 "Nellie", a prototype of Cultivator No. 6, a massive tank that could dig itself into the ground
 Nelly, a nickname for the Giant Petrel, a large seabird 
 "Nelly" or "swish", a slang term for effeminate behaviour and interests in gay male communities